Richard John Davies (born 11 February 1954) is a former English cricketer.  Davies was a right-handed batsman who bowled right-arm medium pace.  He was born at Birmingham, Warwickshire.

Davies played a single first-class match for Warwickshire in 1976 against Oxford University, in what was his only appearance for Warwickshire.

Davies made his Minor Counties Championship debut for Berkshire in 1979 against Buckinghamshire.  During 1979, he represented the county in 6 Minor Counties Championship matches, the last of which came against Wiltshire.

Additionally, he also played a single List-A match for Berkshire in the 1979 Gillette Cup against Durham at Green Lane Cricket Ground, Durham.

References

External links
Richard Davies at Cricinfo

1954 births
Living people
Cricketers from Birmingham, West Midlands
English cricketers
Warwickshire cricketers
Berkshire cricketers
English cricketers of 1969 to 2000